The Lesotho Premier League also known as Econet Premier League is the top football division in Lesotho and was created in 1970. Econet Telecom Lesotho are the current league sponsor, since 2017/2018 season. Vodacom Lesotho were the previous league sponsor and were also the sponsor of the now cancelled Vodacom Soccer Spectacular knockout competition, which was the Lesotho's annual national cup tournament.

Format
The Lesotho Premier League is currently contested by 14 clubs. The league uses a double round robin format meaning one team plays the other twice. Therefore, a team will play a total of 26 games per season. The team with the most points wins the league title.

The Lesotho Premier League is still played on an amateur status.

Sponsorship
Since 2002, Lesotho's Premier League has been sponsored by telecommunications companies. Econet Telecom Lesotho, through its prepaid product Buddie, sponsored the Premier League and Lesotho's lower leagues (the A-Division, B-Division and C-Division) from 2002 until 2009. In 2009, the Lesotho Football Association (LeFA) ended its seven-year association with Econet Telecom Lesotho and signed a three-year partnership with Vodacom Lesotho. As part of the deal, Vodacom Lesotho agreed to sponsor the Premier League and all lower leagues for a combined M1 million per season for three years. However, in 2017, LeFA ended its sponsorship with Vodacom Lesotho to pen a new three-year multi-million maloti sponsorship with the previous sponsor Econet Telecom Lesotho in which the champions will pocket M500 000; a 150% increase from the previous M200 000 received by 2016–2017 champions Bantu.

The sponsor has been able to determine the league's sponsorship name. The list below details who the sponsors have been and what they have called the Lesotho Premier League:
 2002–09: Econet Telecom Lesotho (Buddie Premier League)
 2009–2017: Vodacom Lesotho (Vodacom Premier League)
 2017–2020: Econet Telecom Lesotho (Econet Premier League)
2021–present: Vodacom Lesotho (Vodacom Premier League)

Premier League domestic cups
Lesotho Independence Cup (Top 4)
Lesotho National Insurance Group Cup (Top 8)
MGC Soccer Spectacular

2020–22 season

Bantu FC (Mafeteng)
CCX FC (Leribe)
Kick4Life FC (Maseru)
Lesotho Correctional Services (Maseru)
Lesotho Defence Force (Maseru)
Lesotho Mounted Police Service (Maseru)
Lifofane FC (Butha-Buthe)
Lijabatho FC (Morija)
Likhopo FC (Maseru)
Linare FC (Leribe)
Lioli (Teyateyaneng)
Liphakoe FC (Quthing)
Manonyane FC (Maseru)
Matlama FC (Maseru)
Mazenod Swallows FC (Mazenod)
Sefothafotha FC (Mabote)

Champions

1969 : Matlama FC (Maseru)
1970 : Maseru United
1971 : Majantja FC (Mohale's Hoek)
1972 : Police (Maseru)
1973 : Linare FC (Leribe)
1974 : Matlama FC (Maseru)
1975 : Maseru FC
1976 : Maseru United
1977 : Matlama FC (Maseru)
1978 : Matlama FC (Maseru)
1979 : Linare FC (Leribe)
1980 : Linare FC (Leribe)
1981 : Maseru Brothers
1982 : Matlama FC (Maseru)
1983 : Lesotho Paramilitary Forces (Maseru)
1984 : Lesotho Paramilitary Forces (Maseru)
1985 : Lioli (Teyateyaneng)
1986 : Matlama FC (Maseru)
1987 : Royal Lesotho Defence Force  (Maseru)
1988 : Matlama FC (Maseru)
1989 : Arsenal (Maseru)
1990 : Royal Lesotho Defence Force  (Maseru)
1991 : Arsenal (Maseru)
1992 : Matlama FC (Maseru)
1993 : Arsenal (Maseru)
1994 : Royal Lesotho Defence Force  (Maseru)
1995 : Majantja FC (Mohale's Hoek)

Performance by club

Topscorers

References

External links

RSSSF competition history
Official Lioli Football Club Website
Confederation of African Football (CAF) Official Website

Football leagues in Lesotho
Lesotho
Sports leagues established in 1970
1970s establishments in Lesotho